The Newcastle Thunder are a professional rugby league club based in Newcastle upon Tyne, England. They play in the Betfred Championship competition, the second tier of rugby league in the United Kingdom. They play their home matches at Kingston Park, also home to rugby union side Newcastle Falcons.  The club was known as Gateshead Thunder until 2015.

History
The club was formerly known as Gateshead Thunder, and played their home games at Gateshead International Stadium in Gateshead. The club was formed by the Thunder 2000 working group, supporters of the original Gateshead Thunder after that organisation made the decision to merge with Hull Sharks at the end of the 1999 season.  The new club entered the Northern Ford Premiership for the 2001 season, however they struggled to compete, and eventually finished 17th out of the 19 clubs.

Gateshead continued to struggle in the following season, finishing bottom of the league in 2002.  When the Northern Ford Premiership was split into two divisions for the 2003 season the club joined National League Two, and again finished in the bottom two, being kept off the bottom only by new entrants London Skolars. The club's fortunes began to improve in 2005, a seventh-place finish being enough to gain a first ever place in the play-offs, before losing to Workington Town in their first ever play-off game. The club again finished seventh in 2006, but went on to  lose 46–18 to Featherstone Rovers in the play-offs.

In 2008 the club won its first silverware, finishing the season as League 1 champions.  As champions, the club were promoted to the Championship, and avoided on-field relegation by finishing seventh under coach Steve McCormack   Thunder's joy at securing a second season in the second tier was however short-lived, as the club was wound up following a dispute between the directors.  A new company was formed to continue the club, however the club had to restart as a Championship 1 side, effectively being relegated for the 2010 season.

Gateshead Thunder were taken over by the owners of  rugby union side Newcastle Falcons in 2015.  The club was rebranded as Newcastle Thunder and applied for permission to use Kingston Park in Newcastle as their home ground.

Further silverware was earned in 2016, when Newcastle defeated North Wales Crusaders to win the League 1 Shield

On 10 December 2020 Thunder were promoted to the Championship by a committee to replace Leigh Centurions who were, in turn, promoted to Super League to replace Toronto Wolfpack, who went out of business.  The Thunder will play in the 2021 Championship season.

Kit manufacturers and sponsors

2022 squad

2023 transfers

In

Out

Players

Notable former players
(in alphabetical order)
 Russell Aitken
 Ryan Bailey
 Matt Barron
 David Bates
 Luke Branighan
 Tabua Cakacaka
 Sam Crowther
 Simon Donaghy
 Scott Dyson
 Ian Dickinson-Hall
 Paul Franze
 Ashley Gibson
 Andrew Henderson
 Kris Kahler
 Wade Liddell
 David Mycoe
 Kevin Neighbour
 Chris Parker
 Damien Reid
 Stewart Sanderson
 Netani Suka
 Kerrod Walters
 Nick Youngquest

Past coaches 
Also see :Category:Newcastle Thunder coaches

Andy Kelly (2001-2002)
Dean Thomas (2005-2006)
Dave Woods (2006)
Chris Hood (2009)
Steve McCormack (2009)
Richard Pell (2010-2011)
Stanley Gene (2013-2014)
Mick Mantelli (2016-2017)
Jason Payne (2017-2019
Simon Finnigan (2019-2020)
Eamon O'Carroll (2020–2022)
Chris Thorman (2023-present)

Records

Correct to September 2017

Player records

 Most tries in a match: 5 by Andy Walker vs London Skolars 22 June 2003
 Most points in a season: 246 by Chris Birch, 2005
 Most career tries: 64 by Kevin Neighbour, 2001-2013
 Most career goals: 137 by Paul Thorman, 2001–2004
 Most career points: 365 by Paul Thorman, 2001–2004

Team records
Biggest win: 
98-6 v.  West Wales (at Kingston Park Stadium, 23 September 2018)
Biggest defeat: 
132-0 v.  Blackpool (at Memorial Stadium, 16 May 2010)

Attendance records
Highest all-time attendance: 
6,631 v.  Bradford (at Gateshead International Stadium, 16 May 1999)

Seasons

Honours
RFL League 1:
Winners (1): 2008
League 1 Shield:
Winners (1): 2016

Juniors

Newcastle Thunder run player development programmes for U12 through to U16's

Thunder also run a U16 Scholarship side and an U19 Academy side that play in the Super League U19's structure

The 2018 u16 team has seen wins against London Broncos, Widnes Vikings and Leeds Rhinos and the u19's picking up an early season win against Wakefield Trinity

Notes

References

External links 
Newcastle Thunder website
 Gateshead Thunder on YouTube

Rugby league teams in Tyne and Wear
English rugby league teams
Rugby clubs established in 1999
1999 establishments in England
Gateshead Thunder
Sport in Newcastle upon Tyne